William Van Mildert (6 November 1765 – 21 February 1836) was the last palatine bishop or prince-bishop as Bishop of Durham (1826–1836), and one of the founders of the University of Durham. His name survives in Van Mildert College, founded in 1965 and the Van Mildert Professor of Divinity.

Life
He was the son of Cornelius van Mildert, a gin distiller, and his wife Martha née Hill. Cornelius Van Mildert was the great-grandson of an Amsterdam merchant who migrated to London around 1670, Martha the daughter of William Hill of Vauxhall, Surrey, merchant and financier. William van Mildert was educated at St Saviour's Grammar School, Merchant Taylors' School (then in London) and the Queen's College, Oxford. Loosely attached to the high church party, he was appointed Bishop of Llandaff from 1819 to 1826, a post which he held in commendam with the Deanery of St Paul's between 1820 and 1826, when he was translated to Durham. Prior to this, he was in 1790 the curate of Witham, Essex, where he met Jane (1760-1837), daughter of General Douglas, whom he married in 1795. He became rector of the church of St. Mary-le-Bow in London and Regius Professor of Divinity at Oxford, where he gave the Bampton Lectures for 1814. Van Mildert is often described as a 'stormy petrel' on account of his outspoken expression of his views. As Bishop of Llandaff he broke with the practice of his predecessors and actually resided in the diocese. As the bishop's palace had fallen to ruin, he rented Coldbrook House near Abergavenny. During his time in Llandaff, he gained a reputation as "a conscientious diocesan".

As part of the University of Durham's foundation, behind which he was the driving force, he gave Durham Castle to the university, where it became the home of University College. Auckland Castle therefore became the sole residence of the Bishop of Durham. In addition, he donated a large number of buildings on Palace Green, between the Castle and the Cathedral. These are currently in use by various departments of the university (principally law, music and a small portion of the University Library).

In 1833, he gave 5 acres of land and a lot previously used as a burial pit during the 1831 Cholera Outbreak to the town of Stockton. Using funds allocated during the Commissioners' church Act of 1818, he ordered the construction of the gothic style Holy Trinity Church. This site is now in ruin, and is a Grade II* listed building in the park of Trinity Green.

Van Mildert was the last Bishop of Durham with significant temporal powers as a Palatinate Prince-Bishop.  Those de jure vestiges of feudal jurisprudence were removed and returned to the Crown after his death in 1836 by the Durham (County Palatine) Act 1836. 

In truth, most of the secular power of the Bishop of Durham had already been removed by that time. The Great Reform Act 1832 saw the removal of most of the Prince Bishop's powers although he maintained a seat in the House of Lords and The Municipal Corporations Act 1835 gave the governing power of the town of Durham to an elected body.

Works
 An Inquiry Into the General Principles of Scripture Interpretation

References

1765 births
1836 deaths
Bishops of Llandaff
Bishops of Durham
People associated with Durham University
Deans of St Paul's
People educated at St Saviour's Grammar School
19th-century Welsh Anglican bishops
Alumni of The Queen's College, Oxford
Regius Professors of Divinity (University of Oxford)
19th-century Church of England bishops

18th-century Anglican theologians
19th-century Anglican theologians